Naruse (written: 成瀬 or 鳴瀬) is a Japanese surname. Notable people with the surname include:

, Japanese idol and voice actress
, Japanese test driver and engineer
, Japanese professional wrestler
, Japanese voice actress
, Japanese film director, screenwriter and producer
, Japanese cross-country skier
, Japanese musician and composer
, Japanese footballer
, Japanese baseball player

See also
Naruse Station, a railway station in Machida, Tokyo, Japan

Japanese-language surnames